Wayne Township is one of twelve townships in Bartholomew County, Indiana, United States. As of the 2010 census, its population was 3,815 and it contained 1,492 housing units.

Geography

Cities, towns, villages
 Columbus (south edge)
 Jonesville

Unincorporated towns and census-designated places
 Bethel Village CDP
 Rosstown
 Walesboro
 Waynesville

Adjacent townships
 Columbus Township (north)
 Sand Creek Township (east)
 Redding Township, Jackson County (southeast)
 Hamilton Township, Jackson County (southwest)
 Jackson Township (west)
 Ohio Township (west)
 Harrison Township (northwest)

Cemeteries
The township contains Daugherty Cemetery.

Major highways
  Interstate 65
  Indiana State Road 11

Rivers
 White River

Churches
 St. John's Lutheran Church, White Creek, IN

School districts
 Bartholomew County School Corporation

Political districts
 Indiana's 9th congressional district
 State House District 65
 State Senate District 41

References
 United States Census Bureau 2007 TIGER/Line Shapefiles
 United States Board on Geographic Names (GNIS)
 United States National Atlas

External links
 Indiana Township Association
 United Township Association of Indiana

Townships in Bartholomew County, Indiana
Townships in Indiana